Energy Development Corporation (or simply EDC) is the largest producer of geothermal energy in the Philippines and the second largest in the world. It is involved in alternative energy projects, including geothermal, hydroelectric and wind energy projects. The company was formerly owned by the Philippine National Oil Company, a state corporation owned by the Republic of the Philippines engaged in the exploration of resources, production of energy and distribution of power supply to smaller electricity distributor. EDC was privatized and acquired by the Lopez Group as part of its energy and power supply utility business units.

With over 40 years of pioneering sustainable practices, it is the Philippines’ leading 100% renewable energy producer with an installed capacity of 1,499.14 MW that accounts for 20% of the country’s total installed RE capacity. With several geothermal power plants in the Philippines (including in Bicol, Leyte, Negros Island, and Mindanao), Energy Development Corporation provides 62% (or 1,200 MW) of the country’s total installed geothermal capacity.

History
EDC used to be a subsidiary of Philippine National Oil Company. It was privatized and sold to First Philippine Holdings Corporation, a Lopez-owned and controlled corporation involved in energy and power supply generation business.

In 2013, the company registered consolidated net income attributable to equity holders of the parent of P4.740 billion, lower by 47% than P9.002 billion in 2012. Consolidated revenues decreased by 10% year-on-year to P25.656 billion from P28.369 billion. The attributable net income in 2013 represented 18.5% of total revenue, compared to 31.7% in 2012. Recurring net income attributable to equity holders of the parent decreased by 23% to P6.565 billion from P8.522 billion.

EDC booked a P1.261 billion foreign exchange loss due to the depreciation of the peso against the dollar in 2013, compared to a P1.054 billion foreign exchange gain in 2012 when the peso was stronger. EDC recorded a P625 million loss on damaged assets due to Typhoon Yolanda and a P575 million loss on impairment of exploration and evaluation assets in relation to its Cabalian Project in Southern Leyte.

The Department of Energy issued in May 2013 the Certificate of Confirmation of Commerciality in favor of EDC’s wind project in Burgos, Ilocos Norte under EDC Burgos Wind Power Corporation (EBWPC). The DoE certificate, the first to be issued by the DoE for a wind project, confirmed the Declaration of Commerciality for EBWPC to develop, operate, and maintain a feasible and viable 87 MW wind power project. The certification converts the Burgos wind farm’s Wind Energy Service Contract issued in 2009 from the exploration/pre-development to development/commercial stage.

EDC broke ground in April 2013, after selecting Vestas of Denmark, the world’s largest wind turbine manufacturer, as supplier of the 29 V90-3.0 MW wind turbines. The total cost of the Burgos Wind Farm will be approximately $300 million covering the costs of the wind farm, substation, and transmission line. Once operational, the Burgos Wind Farm is expected to generate approximately 233 GWh annually and power over a million households. It will augment the Luzon grid’s dependable capacity which needs an additional 4,200 MW in the next ten years due to the projected 4.5% annual increase in electricity demand.

EDC has recently embarked on a new mission to forge collaborative pathways for a regenerative future. Part of this mission is to ensure that alternative energy resources are accessible to those who want it. In fact, Energy Development Corporation’s subsidiary, Bacman Geothermal, Inc. (BGI), was awarded a Green Energy Option Program operating permit in 2020. Once the GEOP market is in full commercial operations later in 2021, BGI will facilitate all necessary registration and transfer requirements for prospective customers who want clean and affordable energy.

Affiliates
First Gen Hydro Power Corp.
First Gen is the operator of the 132 megawatts Pantabangan Hydroelectric Powerplant and Masiway Hydroelectric Powerplant both in Pantabangan, Nueva Ecija.

Green Core Geothermal, Inc.
Green Core is the operator of the 305 megawatts Tongonan and the Palinpinon geothermal plants in Leyte and Negros Oriental respectively.

Powerplants
Tongonan Geothermal Powerplant (operated by Green Core)
Palinpinon Geothermal Powerplant (operated by Green Core)
Pantabangan Hydroelectric Powerplant - 120 MW (operated by First Gen)
Masiway Hydroelectric Powerplant - 12.5 MW (operated by First Gen)
BacMan Geothermal Production Field (operated by EDC)
Malitbog Geothermal Power Station
Burgos Wind Farm

References

External links
Energy.com.ph

Electric power companies of the Philippines
Companies listed on the Philippine Stock Exchange
Companies based in Pasig
Lopez Group of Companies
Geothermal energy in the Philippines